Cathepsin Z, also called cathepsin X or cathepsin P, is a protein that in humans is encoded by the CTSZ gene. 
It is a member of the cysteine cathepsin family of cysteine proteases, which has 11 members. As one of the 11 cathepsins, cathepsin Z contains distinctive features from others. Cathepsin Z has been reported involved in cancer malignancy and inflammation.

Structure

Gene
The CTSZ gene is located at 20q13.32 on chromosome 20, consisting of 6 exons. At least two transcript variants of this gene have been found, but the full-length nature of only one of them has been determined.

Protein
Cathepsin Z is characterized by an unusual and unique 3-amino acid insertion in the highly conserved region between the glutamine of the putative oxynion hole and the active site cysteine. The pro-region of cathepsin Z shares no significant similarity with other cathepsin family sequences. It contains only 41 amino acid residues without the conserved motif of ERFNIN or GNFD found in other cysteine proteinases. Besides, the proregion sequence contains no lysine residue.

Function 
The protein encoded by this gene is a lysosomal cysteine proteinase and member of the peptidase C1 family. It exhibits both  and  activities. 
Up to date, eleven human cysteine proteinases have been identified, including cathepsin B, cathepsin C, cathepsin F, cathepsin H, cathepsin K, cathepsin L, cathepsin L2 or V, cathepsin O, cathepsin S, cathepsin Z, and cathepsin W. These cysteine proteinases belong to the papain family and represent a major component of the lysosomal proteolytic system. In addition to playing a critical role in protein degradation and turnover, these proteinases appear to play an extracellular role in a number of normal and pathological conditions. The human cathepsin Z contains distinctive features from other human cysteine proteases. It is an exopeptidase with strict carboxypeptidase activity, while most other cathepsins are endopeptidases. Cathepsin Z has an exposed integrin-binding Arg-Gly-Asp motif within the propeptide of the enzyme, through which cathepsin Z has been shown to interact with several integrins during normal homeostasis, immune processes and cancer. It is also shown to bind cell surface heparin sulphate proteoglycans, indicating possible functions in cellular adhesion and phagocytosis.

Clinical significance 
This gene is expressed ubiquitously in cancer cell lines and primary tumors and, like other members of this family, may be involved in tumorigenesis. For instance, cathepsin Z promotes invasion and migration via a noncatalytic mechanism, suggesting multiple modes of cell invasion may be involved in cancer malignancy. Cathepsin Z is also reported to have a protective, but not proteolytic, function in inflammatory gastric disease. It is reported in another study that cathepsin Z may be responsible for dopamine neuron death and thus involved in the pathogenic cascade event. Single-nucleotide polymorphism in CTSZ is found associated with tuberculosis susceptibility, indicating that the pathways involving this protein could yield novel therapies for tuberculosis.

Interactions 

Cathepsin Z has been shown to interact with the following proteins: CEP55, FBXO6, KIFC1, KRT40, KRTAP5-9, KRTAP5-9, LYPLAL1, MID2, MSN, MTUS2, NOTCH2NL, PLK2, PLSCR1, SGOL2, and SPRED2.

Cathepsin Z has also been found to interact with:
 Integrin,
 PRLP0, and
 γ-Enolase.

References

Further reading

External links 
 The MEROPS online database for peptidases and their inhibitors: C01.013
 

Proteases
EC 3.4.18
Cathepsins